Westland Shopping Center, also known as Westland Center, is an enclosed shopping mall located in the city of Westland, Michigan, a suburb of Detroit. The mall features more than 100 inline stores, with JCPenney and Kohl's serving as anchor stores.

History
Westland Center was developed by J.L. Hudson Corporation. It was designed by Victor Gruen Associates and  Louis G. Redstone Associates.

Westland Center played a role in local history. During the early 1960s, the city of Livonia planned to annex the part of Nankin Township in which the mall was to be built. The shopping center eventually opened on July 28, 1965, joining Northland and Eastland malls in other Detroit Metro cities. In reaction to Livonia's annexation attempts, the people of Nankin Township voted to incorporate the remainder of the township as a city on May 16, 1966, known as the City of Westland, naming it after the mall.

Initial mall tenants included a four-story Hudson's department store, a Kroger grocery store, and a S.S. Kresge five-and-dime store located in the west court. JCPenney joined the mall as a second anchor in 1976. In 1987, MainStreet joined the mall, becoming Kohl's one year later. Sears was first proposed as a new anchor in 1991 and opened in 1997, becoming the first Sears to open in Metro Detroit in over 20 years. In 2001, Hudson's was converted to Marshall Field's, which in turn became Macy's in 2006. In 2014, Westland received a major renovation. Bath & Body Works and Victoria's Secret were remodeled, whilst ULTA Beauty, Charming Charlie and Shoe Carnival opened. 

On January 4, 2017, it was announced that Macy's would be closing as part of a plan to close 68 stores nationwide. Macy's closed its Westland location permanently on March 19, 2017.

On June 17, 2021, it was announced that Sears would be closing their store at the mall with liquidation sales beginning the same day the store closure was announced. The store, which was the last in Michigan, closed on August 15, which left JCPenney and Kohl's as the only 2 anchors left at the mall.

Photos

References

External links
 Official website

Shopping malls in Wayne County, Michigan
Shopping malls established in 1965
1965 establishments in Michigan
Victor Gruen buildings
Westland, Michigan
Namdar Realty Group